The Humanist Party of Angola (PHA) is a political party in Angola led by Florbela Malaquias. It was legalised by the Constitutional Court on 27 May 2022.

History 
The party won two seats in the National Assembly at the 2022 Angolan general election.

Electoral history

Presidential elections

National Assembly elections

References

External links 

 Official website

Political parties in Angola
Political parties established in 2022
Humanist parties
2022 establishments in Africa